Curtis Spiteri (born 15 March 1981 in the United States) is an American retired soccer player. Spiteri played for the Chicago Fire and the Portland Timbers.

References

American soccer players
Association football goalkeepers
Living people
1981 births
Portland Pilots men's soccer players
Chicago Fire FC players
Major League Soccer players
Soccer players from California
People from Vista, California